John M. Nutting VII (born August 29, 1949) is an American politician and retired dairy farmer from Maine. Nutting was a member of the Maine House of Representatives from 1986 to 1992 and served in the Maine Senate from 1996 to 2002 and again from 2004 to 2010. In 2002, Nutting sought the Maine Democratic Party's nomination for Maine's 2nd congressional district. He finished fourth, losing in the Democratic primary to Mike Michaud.

Running for re-election to his sixth term (third consecutive) in the Maine Senate in 2010, Nutting lost to Republican Garrett Mason. Mason's supporters spent $50,000 in private money against Nutting.

Personal
Nutting was born in Lewiston, Maine and earned a B.S. degree in pre-veterinary sciences from the University of Maine in 1971. He is a retired dairy farmer in Leeds, Maine.

References

1949 births
Living people
Politicians from Lewiston, Maine
People from Leeds, Maine
Farmers from Maine
Democratic Party members of the Maine House of Representatives
Democratic Party Maine state senators
21st-century American politicians